Diekirch was a constituency used to elect a single member of the Belgian Chamber of Representatives between 1831 and 1841. In 1839, under the stipulations of the Treaty of London, a portion of Diekirch, along with the constituencies of Grevenmacher and Luxembourg, became parts of the Grand Duchy of Luxembourg.

Representatives

References

Defunct constituencies of the Chamber of Representatives (Belgium)